Joseph Sinnott may refer to:
 Joseph E. Sinnott (born c. 1966), mayor of Erie, Pennsylvania
 Joseph F. Sinnott (1837–1906), Irish businessman who emigrated to Pennsylvania

See also
 Joe Sinnott (1926–2020), American comic book artist